Mahbubnagar Assembly constituency is a constituency of Telangana Legislative Assembly, India. It is one of 14 constituencies in Mahbubnagar district and it includes Mahabubnagar city. It is part of Mahbubnagar Lok Sabha constituency.

Srinivas Goud is the current MLA of the constituency.

Mandals
The Assembly Constituency presently comprises the following Mandals:

Members of Legislative Assembly

Election results

Telangana Legislative Assembly election, 2018

Telangana Legislative Assembly election, 2014

See also
 List of constituencies of Telangana Legislative Assembly

References

Assembly constituencies of Telangana
Mahbubnagar district